The National Athletic Trainers' Association (NATA) is the professional membership association for certified athletic trainers and others who support the athletic training profession. Founded in 1950, the NATA has grown to more than 43,000 members worldwide. The majority of certified athletic trainers choose to be members of NATA to support their profession and to receive a broad array of membership benefits.

History 
The NATA was unofficially formed in late 1949 by a small group of athletic trainers from around the nation. The NATA was founded in 1950 when the first meeting of the NATA took place in Kansas City, Missouri. Nearly 200 athletic trainers gathered to discuss the future of their profession. Recognizing the need for a set of professional standards and appropriate professional recognition, the NATA has helped to unify certified athletic trainers across the country by setting a standard for professionalism, education, certification, research and practice settings. Since its inception, the NATA has been a driving force behind the recognition of the athletic training profession. Once housed in Greenville, North Carolina, the NATA is now headquartered in Dallas, Texas. From humble beginnings, the association has expanded to encompass a global membership totaling more than 43,000, plus a full-time executive director and staff. Members serve as leaders for the association, which has multiple committees working together to help advance the profession.

In 2016 at their national convention in Baltimore the National Athletic Trainers' Association announced the launch of its first-ever public awareness campaign, At Your Own Risk. The campaign is designed to educate, provide resources and equip the public (non-athletic trainers) to act and advocate for safety in work, life, and sport.

Code of Ethics 
The National Athletic Trainers’ Association Code of Ethics states the principles of ethical behavior that should be followed in the practice of athletic training.  It is intended to establish and maintain high standards and professionalism for the athletic training profession.

Districts
The NATA consists of 11 Districts. For purposes of the election of NATA’s President and Board of Directors, and subject to the provisions of Section 5.2 of the NATA Bylaws, NATA shall be divided into ten Districts. Each voting Member of NATA may only be a Member of one District.

Eastern (District 1)

 Connecticut, Massachusetts, Rhode Island, Vermont, New Hampshire, and Maine

Eastern (District 2) 

 Delaware, New Jersey, New York, and Pennsylvania

Mid-Atlantic (District 3) 

 Maryland, North Carolina, South Carolina, Virginia, West Virginia, and District of Columbia

Great Lakes (District 4) 

 Indiana, Michigan, Ohio

Mid America (District 5) 

 Iowa, Kansas, Missouri, Nebraska, North Dakota, Oklahoma, and South Dakota

Southwest (District 6) 

 Arkansas and Texas

Rocky Mountain (District 7) 

 Arizona, Colorado, New Mexico, Utah, and Wyoming

Far West (District 8) 

 California, Hawaii, and Nevada

Southeast (District 9) 

 Alabama, Florida, Georgia, Kentucky, Louisiana, Mississippi, and Tennessee

Northwest (District 10) 

 Alaska, Idaho, Montana, Oregon, Washington, Alberta, British Columbia, and Saskatchewan

Great Lakes (District 11) 
 Illinois, Minnesota, Wisconsin

Awards
Each year during the NATA Annual Meeting & Clinical Symposia a variety of awards are presented for research and outstanding achievement in sports medicine.

Hall of Fame
The NATA Hall of Fame was created to recognize the very best of the athletic training profession and is the highest honor which may be bestowed upon a member.

Fellows program
The NATA Fellows program began in 2008, it recognizes professional achievement in research and/or education, combined with service to the profession. Only the most accomplished scholars in the athletic training profession earn this distinction and are allowed to use the prestigious designation of “FNATA.”

Most Distinguished Athletic Trainer
The Most Distinguished Athletic Trainer Award is a prestigious honor that recognizes NATA members for their exceptional and unique contributions to the athletic training profession. It reflects a lifetime of dedication to the association and the field of athletic training on the national, district and local levels. Candidates are not expected to have experience in all areas, however this is a national award and contributions at the national level are necessary.  These contributions can include, but are not limited to: leadership and advancement of the association and the profession nationally.

Honorary membership
Honorary membership in the National Athletic Trainers’ Association is an exclusive honor reserved for individuals who have made significant contributions to the athletic training profession. Though not certified athletic trainers themselves, they have dedicated a significant portion of their careers to advancing, promoting and championing the efforts of our association and its members.

President's Challenge
The President’s Challenge award recognizes a lifetime of outstanding contributions that directly impact athletics and athletic training, have a national impact or are of major and lasting importance. This award provides a stimulus for continued service, research and education in the field of athletic health care. It fosters joint recognition among members of the NATA and other disciplines and reminds us of the very important role all groups play in the future of athletic care.

Gail Weldon Award of Excellence
The Gail Weldon Award of Excellence is a national honor that recognizes athletic trainers for their commitment to make significant contributions to mentoring, professional development, life balancing, leadership or to improve the health care of females within the profession.

Sayers "Bud" Miller Distinguished Educator Award
This award honors the first chair of the NATA Professional Education Committee, Sayers "Bud" Miller, who was a distinguished educator. The objective of this award is to recognize individuals who follow his example and exemplify excellence in the field of athletic training education. This award recognizes individuals who excel in promoting athletic training education beyond the local level through service and publishing on athletic training issues.

To be eligible for nomination, individuals must currently be BOC certified, a member of the teaching faculty for 10 years, have evidence of quality in published manuscripts, and in formal oral presentations concerned with issues in athletic training.

Bill Chisolm Ethnic Diversity Advisory Council Professional Service Award
The Bill Chisolm Professional Service Award has been presented annually since 1994 in an attempt to recognize any individual who has significantly advanced the provision of athletic health care services to ethnically diverse individuals, or who has made a significant contribution to the professional development and advancement of ethnically diverse Athletic Trainers. The recipient is selected by the committee and is not required to be a member of an underrepresented ethnically diverse population.

Tim Kerin Award for Excellence In Athletic Training

Outstanding Research Manuscript and Outstanding Manuscript

Continuing Education Award
This award honors an individual who has made outstanding contributions to the profession of athletic training in the area of continuing education.

College/University Athletic Trainers’ Committee (CUATC) Awards
The CUATC wishes to recognize those collegiate athletic trainers who have demonstrated exceptional performance as an athletic trainer.

Governmental Affairs Committee Daniel L. Campbell Legislative Awards
Daniel L. Campbell was an active and influential member of the National Athletic Trainers’ Association for 34 years.  Dan served in several capacities in his service to the NATA and the profession, but is most known for his work in governmental affairs and reimbursement.  He was instrumental in creating the Reimbursement Advisory Group, the precursor to the Committee on Revenue, and co-authored a booked titled “Reimbursement for Athletic Trainers” about the history of the reimbursement effort.  NATA named Dan a Most Distinguished Athletic Trainer in 1996.

The Daniel L. Campbell Legislative Award is given for two types of effort, each important in achieving success in the legislative and regulatory arenas.
Class I- A state association with an outstanding effort toward legislation.
Class II- A state association who has undertaken activities aimed at keeping athletic training “on the radar screen” of legislators.

Public Relations Contest
Each March, the NATA PR Committee issues a call for entries for the annual public relations contest. The contest recognizes outstanding PR achievements by NATA districts, states, individuals or student groups.
 
Categories include:
 Most creative effort
 Greatest impact
 Best student effort
 Best Grassroots effort
 Best state association effort
 
Entries must educate, use proper “athletic trainer” terminology and must not be self-serving.

American Academy of Podiatric Sports Medicine For Excellence in Athletic Training Award
The American Academy of Podiatric Sports Medicine, the largest sports medicine affiliate of the American Podiatric Medical Association, presents this annual award to an athletic trainer who displays commitment and excellence in the field of sports medicine.

Deloss Brubaker Student Writing Award
NATA undergraduate student members are invited to submit original manuscripts for the annual student writing contest. One winner will be selected for each of the following categories:

 Original Research
 Case Report
 Literature Review

Young Professionals’ Committee National Distinction Award
The National Distinction Award is the YPC’s highest honor. The YPC wishes to recognize young professional athletic trainer that has made an immediate and definitive impact on the athletic training profession at the national, district, or state level.

References

External links 
 

Athletic training
Sports medicine organizations
Sports professional associations based in the United States
Sports organizations established in 1950
1950 establishments in the United States